In mathematics, the inverse Laplace transform of a function F(s) is the piecewise-continuous and exponentially-restricted real function f(t) which has the property:

where  denotes the Laplace transform.

It can be proven that, if a function F(s) has the inverse Laplace transform f(t), then f(t) is uniquely determined (considering functions which differ from each other only on a point set having Lebesgue measure zero as the same). This result was first proven by Mathias Lerch in 1903 and is known as Lerch's theorem.

The Laplace transform and the inverse Laplace transform together have a number of properties that make them useful for analysing linear dynamical systems.

Mellin's inverse formula
An integral formula for the inverse Laplace transform, called the Mellin's inverse formula, the Bromwich integral, or the Fourier–Mellin integral, is given by the line integral:

where the integration is done along the vertical line Re(s) = γ in the complex plane such that γ is greater than the real part of all singularities of F(s) and F(s) is bounded on the line, for example if the contour path is in the region of convergence. If all singularities are in the left half-plane, or F(s) is an entire function , then γ can be set to zero and the above inverse integral formula becomes identical to the inverse Fourier transform.

In practice, computing the complex integral can be done by using the Cauchy residue theorem.

Post's inversion formula
Post's inversion formula for Laplace transforms, named after Emil Post, is a simple-looking but usually impractical formula for evaluating an inverse Laplace transform.

The statement of the formula is as follows: Let f(t) be a continuous function on the interval [0, ∞) of exponential order, i.e.

 

for some real number b. Then for all s > b, the Laplace transform for f(t) exists and is infinitely differentiable with respect to s. Furthermore, if F(s) is the Laplace transform of f(t), then the inverse Laplace transform of F(s) is given by

 

for t > 0, where F(k) is the k-th derivative of F with respect to s.

As can be seen from the formula, the need to evaluate derivatives of arbitrarily high orders renders this formula impractical for most purposes.
   
With the advent of powerful personal computers, the main efforts to use this formula have come from dealing with approximations or asymptotic analysis of the Inverse Laplace transform, using the Grunwald–Letnikov differintegral to evaluate the derivatives.   
    
Post's inversion has attracted interest due to the improvement in computational science and the fact that it is not necessary to know where the poles of F(s) lie, which make it possible to calculate the asymptotic behaviour for big x using inverse Mellin transforms for several arithmetical functions related to the Riemann hypothesis.

Software tools
 InverseLaplaceTransform performs symbolic inverse transforms in Mathematica
 Numerical Inversion of Laplace Transform with Multiple Precision Using the Complex Domain in Mathematica gives numerical solutions
 ilaplace performs symbolic inverse transforms in MATLAB
 Numerical Inversion of Laplace Transforms in Matlab
 Numerical Inversion of Laplace Transforms based on concentrated matrix-exponential functions in Matlab

See also
 Inverse Fourier transform
 Poisson summation formula

References

Further reading
 
 
  (p. 662 or search Index for "Bromwich Integral", a nice explanation showing the connection to the Fourier transform)
 
 Elementary inversion of the Laplace transform. Bryan, Kurt. Accessed June 14, 2006.

External links
 Tables of Integral Transforms at EqWorld: The World of Mathematical Equations.

Transforms
Complex analysis
Integral transforms
Laplace transforms